Branko Ištvančić (born April 5, 1967) is a Croatian film director.

Born in Subotica, Ištvančić graduated from the Academy of Dramatic Art, University of Zagreb in 1999. Since 2003 he has been employed at the Croatian Radiotelevision, working as a director of documentary films, educational programs, and television series and films.

Ištvančić's award-winning documentary The Cormorant Scarecrow (1998) has been described by Croatian film critics as one of the best Croatian documentary films of the 1990s.

His feature film debut, The Ghost in the Swamp, placed 2nd among domestic films in the Croatian box office in 2006.

The film won the Gold Camera for best documentary at its Los Angeles premiere and in 2013 at the International Festival of Ethnographic Film in Romania, won Grand Prize for Best Film.



Selected filmography

Short films

 Saying Goodbye (Rastanak, 1993)
 Freeze Frame (Zamrznuti kadar, 1999)

Documentary films

 The Cormorant Scarecrow (1998)
 Wellman (2003)
 From Grain to Painting (2012)

Feature films

 The Ghost in the Swamp (2006)
 The Bridge at the End of the World (2013)

Sources

External links
 
 

1967 births
Living people
Croatian film directors
Croatian documentary film directors
Academy of Dramatic Art, University of Zagreb alumni
Croats of Vojvodina
Film people from Subotica